The Koeru TV Mast is a  high guyed mast in Central Estonia. It is located in Kapu village northwest of Koeru small borough in Järva Parish, Järva County and was built in 1976. Koeru TV Mast is the tallest structure in Estonia. It is used for FM and TV broadcasting.

References

External links

Towers completed in 1976
Communication towers in Estonia
Buildings and structures in Järva County
Radio masts and towers in Europe
Järva Parish
1976 establishments in Estonia